The 1933–34 Ottawa Senators season was the team's 16th season in the NHL and 48th season of play overall. It was the last season to be played by the NHL franchise under the Senators' banner, as the franchise would move to St. Louis, Missouri, playing as the St. Louis Eagles the next season.

Regular season
Before the season, the Sens replaced head coach Cy Denneny with former defenceman Buck Boucher. Ottawa-born player Syd Howe was named captain of the team.  Cooney Weiland, who led the team in scoring the previous season, would hold out, but was eventually signed, and scored only two goals in nine games before the Senators sent him to the Detroit Red Wings for Carl Voss.

The Senators would be led offensively by Earl Roche, who had a team high 29 points, his brother Desse Roche would score a team high 14 goals, while Max Kaminsky would put up a team high 17 assists. Frank Finnigan chipped in with ten goals, to reach 104 in his career.

Bill Beveridge would take over the Senators' goal-tending duties, winning 13 games, while posting three shutouts and a 2.86 GAA.  In the Senators last game of the season at home, against the New York Americans, Americans goalie Roy Worters was injured and not able to play after the first period.  The Senators let New York use Alex Connell, the Senators backup who had not played a minute all season long, and Connell would play well enough to defeat the Senators 3–2. The last game of the season was a 2–2 draw against the Montreal Maroons at the Montreal Forum. Desse Roche scored the last goal for Ottawa on March 17, 1934.

After the season, the Senators announced that the NHL franchise would relocate to St. Louis, Missouri where they would become the St. Louis Eagles, after 16 seasons in the NHL. To fill the Auditorium, the organization kept an Ottawa Senators club in senior league play until 1954. Ottawa would not have an NHL team again until 1992, 58 years later.

Schedule and results

Final standings

Record vs. opponents

Regular season

Player statistics

Regular season
Scoring

Goaltending

Awards and records
Milestones
 Frank Finnigan, 100th NHL goal

Transactions
The Senators were involved in the following transactions during the 1933–34 season.

Trades

Free agents signed

Playoffs
They didn't qualify for the playoffs

See also
 1933–34 NHL season
 History of the National Hockey League

References

SHRP Sports
The Internet Hockey Database
National Hockey League Guide & Record Book 2007

Ottawa Senators (original) seasons
Ottawa
Ottawa